The Women's RS:X class at the 2011 ISAF Sailing World Championships was held in Perth, Western Australia between 5 and 11 December 2011.

Results

References

External links

Women's RS:X
Windsurfing World Championships
2011 in women's sailing
2011 in Australian women's sport